Bruce Alan Wilkerson (born July 28, 1964) is a former American football player who played offensive tackle for three National Football League (NFL) teams  from 1987 to 1997. He started in Super Bowl XXXI for the Green Bay Packers.  Wilkerson played college football at the University of Tennessee, where he was twice named All-SEC.

Wilkerson attended Loudon High School in Loudon, Tennessee, where he played both offensive tackle and defensive tackle, and was named to the all-state team his senior year.  He signed with Tennessee in 1982, though he was a redshirt his first year.

Working with Tennessee offensive line coach (and future head coach) Phillip Fulmer, Wilkerson secured a spot in the second string during the 1983 season, backing up veteran tackle Curt Singer.  By his sophomore season in 1984, he was a starter, anchoring a line that helped running back Johnnie Jones set career rushing records.  Wilkerson was an integral member of the 1985 "Sugar Vols" squad, and was named All-SEC and 2nd-team All-American at the end of the season.  In the 1986 Sugar Bowl, Wilkerson's block on Miami nose guard Jerome Brown helped spring Jeff Powell's 60-yard touchdown run.

After an All-SEC senior year in 1986, Wilkerson was drafted by the Los Angeles Raiders in the second round of the 1987 NFL Draft.  He spent his first eight seasons with the Raiders, and was a starter throughout the early 1990s.  He was on the inaugural roster of the Jacksonville Jaguars in 1995, and closed out his career with Green Bay.

References

External links
Profile at NFL.com

Living people
Los Angeles Raiders players
Green Bay Packers players
Jacksonville Jaguars players
Tennessee Volunteers football players
1964 births
People from Loudon, Tennessee
Players of American football from Tennessee